Georgia State Route 24 Spur may refer to:

 Georgia State Route 24 Spur (Commerce): a former spur route of State Route 24 that existed entirely within the city limits of Commerce
 Georgia State Route 24 Spur (Davisboro): a former spur route of State Route 24 that existed entirely within the city limits of Davisboro
 Georgia State Route 24 Spur (Madison): a spur route of State Route 24 that exists entirely within the city limits of Madison
 Georgia State Route 24 Spur (Sandersville): a former spur route of State Route 24 that existed partially in Sandersville
 Georgia State Route 24 Spur (Washington County): a spur route of State Route 24 that exists just west of Sandersville

024 Spur